Liu Quin is a character featured within the  Chinese novel Investiture of the Gods (more commonly known as Fengshen Yanyi). 

Liu Quin is a renowned firewood cutter renowned across the capital, Zhaoge. One day, Liu Quin would browse around the southern gate of the capital and notice a small fortune telling house. Upon approaching this house, he would first wake up Jiang Ziya, the owner, and tell him, "If you can tell the past and the future, then your fortune telling skill must be great. Tell me my fortune for this day. If accurate, I will give you twenty coppers. If not, I will give you my fist so that you will never make a fool out of anyone again!" Thus, Jiang Ziya would present a fortune before Liu Quin that would seem near to impossible. While even trying to change the outcome of his fortune, his destiny had already been set any everything ended up turning out exactly as Jiang had predicted.

Thus, the next morning, Liu Qian would rush quickly into Jiang's house studio and loudly utter the words, "Mr. Jiang is the best fortune teller who ever lived! In fact, I think he is a demigod from heaven. Now that we have such a genius among us, no one needs to suffer any more anxiety." With these words, Liu Qian, the very strong man who was feared as a bully would be well respected following this point.

References
Investiture of the Gods Chapter 16 pages 186 - 188

Investiture of the Gods characters